Giovanni Francesco Pogliasca or Giovanni Francesco Polascha (died 1561) was a Roman Catholic prelate who served as Bishop of Luni e Sarzana (1537–1561).

Biography
On 28 Nov 1537, he was appointed during the papacy of Pope Paul III as Bishop of Luni e Sarzana.
On 22 Feb 1538, he was consecrated bishop by Alfonso Oliva, Bishop of Bovino, with Uberto Gambara, Bishop of Tortona, and Pietro Lamberti, Bishop of Caserta, serving as co-consecrators. 
He served as Bishop of Luni e Sarzana until his death in 1561.

References

External links and additional sources
 (for Chronology of Bishops) 
 (for Chronology of Bishops) 

16th-century Italian Roman Catholic bishops
Bishops appointed by Pope Paul III
1561 deaths